Yacouba Nambelesseny Bamba (born 30 November 1991) is an Ivorian professional footballer who most recently played for Bangladesh Premier League club Chittagong Abahani as an attacking midfielder.

Career
On 10 February 2022, Al-Faisaly announced the signing of Bamba.

Family
His older brother Fousseni Bamba is also a footballer.

References

External links
 

1991 births
Living people
People from Bingerville
Association football midfielders
Ivorian footballers
Ivorian expatriate footballers
Russian Premier League players
Uzbekistan Super League players
ASEC Mimosas players
AS Denguélé players
FC Slutsk players
CSF Bălți players
FC Orenburg players
FC Saxan players
Abahani Limited (Chittagong) players
Expatriate footballers in Moldova
Expatriate footballers in Belarus
Expatriate footballers in Russia
Expatriate footballers in Uzbekistan
Expatriate footballers in Bangladesh
Ivorian expatriate sportspeople in Moldova
Ivorian expatriate sportspeople in Belarus
Ivorian expatriate sportspeople in Russia